Eupinivora hamartopenis is a species of moth of the family Tortricidae. It is found in Durango, Mexico.

The length of the forewings is 7.5–8.5 mm for males and 8.5–9 mm for females. The ground colour of the forewings is whitish in the form of a longitudinal fascia extending from near the base to the middle of the wing. The remainder of the wing is dark orange ferruginous to golden orange. The hindwings are pale greyish brown.

The larvae probably feed on Pinus species.

Etymology
The species name is derived from Greek hamarto (meaning sin, error) and penis or intromittent organ.

References

Moths described in 1986
Cochylini